The Doctor of Liberal Studies degree, abbreviated  (D.L.S.), for the Latin Doctor Liberalium Studiorum, is an advanced academic degree offered by  Georgetown University, Southern Methodist University, University of Memphis and other research universities.

Doctor of Liberal Studies programs are typically geared for accomplished professionals seeking a rigorous interdisciplinary academic program that can be tailored to their established expertise. Admissions to D.L.S. programs are very competitive, and cohorts typically consist of six to 15 students. All D.L.S. candidates already hold advanced degrees, typically more than one.

The D.L.S. is a research doctorate that prepares students to make original intellectual contributions in their fields of study, and are not primarily intended for the practice of a profession. Rather than pursue research in a single discipline, D.L.S. students create new knowledge through the synthesis of interdisciplinary research.  The U.S. Department of Education and the National Science Foundation recognize numerous non-professional, research-oriented doctoral degrees (such as the Doctor of Liberal Studies) that require a dissertation or corresponding project as equivalent to the Doctor of Philosophy (Ph.D.) and does not discriminate between them.

Through the required foundational courses in the humanities, specifically philosophy, theology, history, art, literature, and the social sciences, the  Doctor of Liberal Studies establishes the intellectual and scholarly context needed to carry out serious interdisciplinary study and research in ethics and crucial issues in contemporary thought. Graduates of the program typically return to their established career domains, including national security, journalism, health care, education, law and other areas. A growing number has also secured respected university positions, including those on the tenure-track and in higher education administration.

References

Liberal Studies